Captain Frederick William Holmes VC (15 September 1889 – 22 October 1969) also known as F. W. Holmes, was an English recipient of the Victoria Cross, the highest and most prestigious award for gallantry in the face of the enemy that can be awarded to British and Commonwealth forces.

Biography

Holmes was 24 years old, and a Lance Corporal in the 2nd Battalion, The King's Own Yorkshire Light Infantry, British Army during the First World War when the following deed took place at the battle of Le Cateau for which he was awarded the VC.

On 26 August 1914 at Le Cateau, France, Lance-Corporal Holmes carried a wounded man out of the trenches under heavy fire and later helped to drive a gun out of action by taking the place of a driver who was wounded. He later achieved the rank of Captain.

Indian rope trick

In 1917, Holmes, who was a Lieutenant at the time, stated that whilst on his veranda with a group of officers in Kirkee, he had observed the Indian rope trick being performed by an old man and young boy. The boy climbed the rope, balanced himself and then descended. The old man tapped the rope and it collapsed. This demonstration did not include the disappearance of the boy. In February 1919, Holmes presented a photograph he had taken of the trick at a meeting with members of The Magic Circle. It was examined by Robert Elliot, who stated it was not a demonstration of the Indian rope trick but an example of a balancing trick on a bamboo pole. Elliot noted that "the tapering of the pole is an absolutely clear feature and definitely shows that it was not a rope." Holmes later admitted this, however, the photograph was reproduced by the press in several magazines and newspapers as proof the trick had been successfully demonstrated. Although discredited, the photograph is considered to be the first ever taken of the trick.

References

External links
Lance Corporal Frederick Holmes (biography)
Burial location of Frederick Holmes "South Australia"
News item "Frederick Holmes' Victoria Cross sold at auction"
 "Official Imperial War Museum photo"

1889 births
1969 deaths
King's Own Yorkshire Light Infantry officers
British World War I recipients of the Victoria Cross
People from Bermondsey
British Army personnel of World War I
King's Own Yorkshire Light Infantry soldiers
English emigrants to Australia
British Army recipients of the Victoria Cross
Burials in South Australia
Military personnel from London